The Shield was a professional wrestling stable in WWE that consisted of  Dean Ambrose, Roman Reigns, and Seth Rollins. Their original characters were mercenaries for CM Punk; however, they quickly became mainstay main-event names.

The group debuted on November 18, 2012 at the Survivor Series pay-per-view. The Shield was a dominant force in six-man tag team matches with an undefeated televised streak lasting from December 2012 to May 2013, during which they scored a victory at WrestleMania 29. In May 2013 at Extreme Rules, all three members of The Shield won a championship, with Ambrose winning the United States Championship while Rollins and Reigns captured the WWE Tag Team Championship. Rollins and Reigns were WWE Tag Team Champions until October 2013, and Ambrose was United States Champion until May 2014, which was a record reign for the WWE version of the championship. As a Shield member, Reigns gained prominence by setting and equaling elimination records at the 2013 Survivor Series and the 2014 Royal Rumble events.

The Shield at various points served as hired guns for CM Punk and The Authority while later going on to face their former employers in separate feuds. They wrestled in the main event of numerous Raw and SmackDown television shows and headlined one pay-per-view, the 2014 Payback event, which was their final match as a trio until 2017. Rollins left the group on June 2, when he attacked Ambrose and Reigns with a chair and sided with The Authority. Ambrose and Reigns went on their own ways as singles wrestlers later that month, marking the end of The Shield.

Following the group's dissolution, each member of The Shield went on to become a world champion. All three reigned as WWE World Heavyweight Champion within a three-minute span at the end of the 2016 Money in the Bank event: Rollins defeated Reigns for the championship and then Ambrose cashed in his Money in the Bank briefcase (which he won earlier that night) on Rollins to win the title.

In the lead-up to the 2017 SummerSlam event, Ambrose and Rollins reunited and captured the Raw Tag Team Championship from Cesaro and Sheamus. Then on the October 9 episode of Raw, the trio reunited to feud with The Miz, Cesaro and Sheamus. In December 2017, the team dissolved once again after Ambrose suffered an injury. Following Ambrose's return from injury the previous week, The Shield reunited once again on August 20, 2018 episode of Raw to prevent Braun Strowman from cashing in his Money in the Bank contract on Reigns. However, in October that same year, The Shield disbanded following Reigns' hiatus over his leukemia rediagnosis and Ambrose's betrayal towards Rollins. After Reigns returned in February 2019 and announced that his leukemia was in remission, the trio reunited and won the main event match of Fastlane that same month. Although this was promoted as The Shield's final match together, they reunited at the special event The Shield's Final Chapter, Ambrose's final WWE match due to not renewing his contract.

Characters 
The Shield has from the beginning of their existence voiced their intentions to fight what they perceived as "injustice". They were also known for their black ring attire (including protective vests) with each member having their own style, their tendency to approach the ring through the live audience and their trademark promos, which were recorded from a first-person perspective using a handheld camcorder. They were a group which possessed teamwork and a willingness to sacrifice themselves as an individual for the good of the team, which achieved victories by overwhelming opponents with superior numbers after incapacitating their teammates. The Shield referred to WWE as their "yard" during their speeches and were nicknamed as "The Hounds of Justice".

For their individual characters:
 Dean Ambrose – played the "de facto leader" and "mouthpiece" of the group. Ambrose's role was described as being "the more vocal leader of the group" and was then tweaked to become more verbally arrogant in mid-2013. WWE also described Ambrose's character as "slightly off" and "wild".
 Roman Reigns – was established by WWE as the "powerhouse" and "heavy hitter" of The Shield, as well as an "exceptional athlete". Reigns was noted as the least talkative of The Shield members. In mid-2013, Reigns' character was described as being tweaked to become extremely confident and a source of leadership with "quiet strength".
 Seth Rollins – was described as having a "chaotic" in-ring style. In mid-2013, he was described as "the out-spoken, hot-head who will do crazy things" to help The Shield. In 2014, Rollins gained the labels of "The Aerialist" and "The Architect" of The Shield. While out of character, Rollins explained "The Architect" moniker as that he had a "cerebral approach" in coming "up with the blueprints" for their wrestling matches or storylines.

While out of character, the group has credited trainer/producer Joey Mercury as a mentor. The group were originally supposed to wear turtlenecks and carry riot shields, but changed their attire before their debut. CM Punk later claimed to have come up with the idea of The Shield, which he proposed were to be his storyline protectors and consisting of Ambrose, Rollins and Kassius Ohno—Punk described "their guy", Reigns, replacing Ohno, who had been rejected by Triple H. WWE Spanish announcer Marcelo Rodríguez named the group for Ambrose, Reigns and Rollins "The Shield" on November 19, 2012, one day after the Survivor Series event.

History

Original run (2012–2014)

Mercenaries for CM Punk 

Ambrose, Reigns, and then-reigning NXT Champion Seth Rollins debuted at Survivor Series on November 18, interfering in the triple threat main event between CM Punk, John Cena and Ryback for the WWE Championship, allowing Punk to pin Cena to retain the title. On the November 26 episode of Raw, the group identified themselves as "The Shield" and vowed to rally against "injustices". Despite claiming that they were not working for either Punk or his manager Paul Heyman, over the next few weeks on both Raw and SmackDown they routinely emerged from the crowd to attack Punk's adversaries. They also attacked Randy Orton after he defeated Brad Maddox, who was the referee who helped Punk defeat Ryback during their Hell in a Cell match at the previous Hell in a Cell event for the WWE Championship. This led to The Shield's debut match at TLC: Tables, Ladders & Chairs on December 16, where they defeated Ryback and Team Hell No (Daniel Bryan and Kane) in a Tables, Ladders and Chairs match.

After TLC, despite continuing to attack Punk's and Maddox's adversaries such as Ric Flair, Brodus Clay and Sheamus, The Shield soon expanded their ambushes to other wrestlers, such as Mick Foley, Tommy Dreamer and Ricardo Rodriguez. The Shield's attacks were also used to write off wrestlers from television via injury angles, such as Randy Orton and Sin Cara, who were already suffering from legitimate injuries.

On the January 2, 2013 episode of NXT (which was taped on December 6, 2012), The Shield made their first appearance as a group in NXT, where Rollins was the inaugural NXT Champion. Rollins defended his title against Corey Graves, but Ambrose and Reigns attacked Graves to cause a disqualification so that Rollins retained his title. After the match, The Shield then fended off the entire NXT locker room, but retreated from Big E Langston. On the January 9 episode of NXT (which was taped on the same date as the previous episode), Rollins lost the NXT Championship to Langston in a No Disqualification match after the NXT locker room neutralized the interference of the other Shield members.

On the January 7 episode of Raw, The Shield once again aided CM Punk by attacking Ryback during their Tables, Ladders and Chairs match for the WWE Championship, which resulted in Punk retaining the title. On the January 21 episode of Raw, The Shield attacked The Rock, Punk's WWE Championship contender at the Royal Rumble, resulting in Mr. McMahon declaring that their interference in the title match would result in Punk being stripped of the championship. Four days later on SmackDown, Punk denied an alliance with The Shield before calling them out and informing them that he did not want them to interfere in his upcoming title match. However, during Punk's title match at the Royal Rumble on January 27, during a blackout, The Rock was attacked by The Shield in the darkness and when the lights came back on, he had been put through the announce table, leading to Punk pinning The Rock and retaining the championship; the match, however, was immediately restarted by McMahon with The Rock winning the WWE Championship. The following night on Raw, it was revealed through footage played by McMahon that Punk's manager Paul Heyman had been paying The Shield and Brad Maddox to work for him all along.

Undefeated streak 

On the January 28 episode of Raw, The Shield attacked John Cena, as well as Sheamus and Ryback when they attempted to save Cena. The next week on Raw, Maddox called out The Shield and revealed that he was the one who had given McMahon the footage showing that they were working for Heyman, thus prompting The Shield to attack Maddox until they were forced to retreat. The Shield justified their attacks due to a "decade of injustice" caused by Cena. This set up a six-man tag team match on February 17 at Elimination Chamber, which The Shield won. They continued their feud against Sheamus, having several matches against him, including a six-man tag team at WrestleMania 29 where The Shield defeated Sheamus, Randy Orton and Big Show.

On the April 8 episode of Raw, The Shield attempted to attack The Undertaker, but were forced to retreat by Team Hell No. This led to a match where The Shield defeated the combination of The Brothers of Destruction and Team Hell No (Undertaker, Kane and Bryan) on the April 22 episode of Raw. On the April 26 episode of SmackDown, Ambrose made his singles debut against The Undertaker and lost via submission, but after the match The Shield attacked Undertaker. Ambrose then started a feud with United States Champion Kofi Kingston, winning the title at Extreme Rules. At the same event, Rollins and Reigns defeated Team Hell No to win the WWE Tag Team Championship.

All champions and Triple H's enforcers 

From May to August, The Shield defended their championships against several opponents. Ambrose faced Kingston, Kane, and Rob Van Dam while Rollins and Reigns faced Team Hell No, Daniel Bryan and Randy Orton, The Usos. On the June 14 episode of SmackDown, The Shield's unpinned/unsubmitted streak in televised six-man tag team matches came to an end at the hands of Team Hell No and Randy Orton, when Bryan submitted Rollins.

On the August 19 episode of Raw, The Shield began working for chief operating officer Triple H and aiding WWE Champion and "the face of WWE" Randy Orton against his rival Daniel Bryan, while also attacking wrestlers like Big Show and Dolph Ziggler for speaking out against Triple H's regime. At Night of Champions on September 15, The Shield had successful title defenses when Ambrose defeated Ziggler while Rollins and Reigns defeated The Prime Time Players (Darren Young and Titus O'Neil).

At Battleground on October 6, after being kayfabe fired, Cody Rhodes and Goldust earned their jobs back by beating Rollins and Reigns in a non-title match. On the September 23 episode of Raw, The Shield lost an eleven-on-three handicap elimination match. On the October 14 episode of Raw, Reigns and Rollins lost the WWE Tag Team Championship to the Rhodes brothers in a No Disqualification match after interference from Big Show. On the October 16 episode of Main Event, Ambrose again successfully retained the United States Championship against Ziggler. At Hell in a Cell on October 27, Rollins and Reigns lost a triple threat tag team match for the WWE Tag Team Championship against the Rhodes Brothers and The Usos, while Ambrose retained the championship after a countout loss to Big E Langston.

Cracks in The Shield 

The first seeds of dissension were sown in The Shield (especially between Ambrose and Reigns) with Ambrose's boasting of being the only member left with a championship, but from then on Ambrose was frequently pinned during The Shield's matches. At Survivor Series on November 24, The Shield teamed with The Real Americans (Antonio Cesaro and Jack Swagger) to defeat the team of Rey Mysterio, the Rhodes Brothers and The Usos in a Survivor Series elimination tag team match, with Ambrose being the first man eliminated.

In late November, they started a feud with CM Punk, leading to a handicap match between Punk and The Shield at TLC: Tables, Ladders & Chairs on December 15, which Punk won after capitalizing on The Shield's lack of co-ordination after Ambrose was accidentally speared by Reigns. WWE originally planned to break up The Shield after the match, but they asked to remain together due to their lack of experience as singles wrestlers.

Going into 2014, Punk's taunts increased tension between The Shield members, and Reigns emerged as the only Shield member to defeat Punk in a singles match on the January 6 episode of Raw, albeit with a distraction from Ambrose. All three members of The Shield competed in the 2014 Royal Rumble match, during which Ambrose tried to eliminate Reigns, who retaliated by eliminating both Ambrose and Rollins.

On the January 27, episode of Raw, The Shield faced the team of Daniel Bryan, John Cena and Sheamus in a six-man tag team qualifying match for the Elimination Chamber match for the WWE World Heavyweight Championship, but lost by disqualification after The Wyatt Family interfered. The Shield vowed revenge, so a match was set up between The Shield and The Wyatt Family. Meanwhile, on the February 10 episode of Raw, Ambrose's open challenge for the United States Championship was answered by Mark Henry, with Ambrose retaining by disqualification due to The Shield's interference, and Reigns defeated Henry without interference. At Elimination Chamber on February 23, The Shield lost to The Wyatt Family as Ambrose and Bray Wyatt brawled into the crowd, but Wyatt later returned to the ring with no sign of Ambrose, which caused Rollins and Reigns to be outnumbered and overwhelmed. On the March 3 episode of Raw, The Shield lost a rematch against The Wyatt Family when The Shield's poor teamwork led to Rollins walking out during the match.

Rebellion against The Authority 

On the March 7 episode of SmackDown, the members of The Shield met in the ring to clear the air on their disharmony, and Rollins explained that his actions achieved his purpose of getting Ambrose and Reigns to finally see eye-to-eye, which led to the trio ultimately reconciling.

During their next storyline, the Shield turned into babyfaces and feuded with Kane after refusing to assault Jerry Lawler. The feud also The Authority's The New Age Outlaws (Road Dogg and Billy Gunn) after they sided with Kane, culminating in a match at WrestleMania XXX, which The Shield emerged victorious quickly and decisively. Then, The Authority leader Triple H reunited his previous stable Evolution with Orton and Batista, and at Extreme Rules, The Shield defeated Evolution. The following night on Raw, Triple H forced Ambrose to defend the United States Championship in a 20-man battle royal without Reigns and Rollins being involved. (Though they were both outside the ring the whole match yelling encouragement to him, they could not physically interfere.) Ambrose would end up losing the title after he was the last eliminated by Sheamus. At Payback, they defeated Evolution in a No Holds Barred elimination match, in which no Shield member was eliminated.

Rollins' betrayal and separation 

The following night on Raw, Triple H announced his intention to continue Evolution's feud with The Shield, but Batista quit WWE and left Evolution. Later that night with The Shield in the ring, Triple H's "plan B" for destroying The Shield turned out to be Rollins suddenly attacking Ambrose and Reigns with a steel chair, signalling Rollins re-alignment with The Authority. On the June 9 episode of Raw, Rollins described his betrayal as severing a business relationship and that he had destroyed "his own creation" to further his own interests, while Ambrose and Reigns (still labelled as The Shield) addressed Rollins' betrayal with Ambrose describing Rollins as a "cancer" in The Shield, while Reigns claimed that Rollins "committed the most unforgivable sin". Later that night, Ambrose and Reigns had their final match as The Shield, teaming up with John Cena to defeat The Wyatt Family.

While Ambrose and Reigns did not fall out with each other, they did begin to take separate paths as Ambrose declared his intention to take revenge on Rollins, while Reigns set his sights on the WWE World Heavyweight Championship. While the duo were still referred to as The Shield on the June 13 episode of SmackDown, Ambrose debuted new theme music, ring attire, and entrance on the June 16 episode of Raw. Reigns, however, largely retained The Shield's ring attire, theme music, and continued to enter the ring through the live audience. On the June 24 episode of Main Event, Reigns confirmed that he was on his own and no longer with The Shield, thus confirming that The Shield had dissolved.

Subsequent reunions (2017–2019)

2017 

Throughout July 2017, Ambrose, who was drafted to the Raw brand via the Superstar Shake-up, and Rollins teased a potential reunion between the two, but Ambrose continuously declined Rollins' offer to reunite, primarily due to trust issues from Rollins' betrayal three years prior.

On the July 31 episode of Raw, Rollins was confronted by Raw Tag Team Champions Cesaro and Sheamus, and later won a match against Sheamus after which the duo attacked Rollins before Ambrose came down to make the save, though backstage Ambrose told Rollins that he would not help him if Rollins got outnumbered again. The following week on Raw, after Rollins lost a rematch against Sheamus and was once again attacked after the match, Ambrose did not help him. Later that night, Ambrose defeated Cesaro, only to be subsequently attacked by the duo before being saved by Rollins. On the August 14 episode of Raw, an argument in the ring culminated in Ambrose and Rollins brawling with each other only to fight off Cesaro and Sheamus and performing a fist bump to a loud ovation. Rollins and Ambrose defeated the champions at SummerSlam, winning the titles.

At No Mercy on September 24, Ambrose and Rollins made their first successful title defense in a rematch against Cesaro and Sheamus. Then, Ambrose and Rollins reunited with Reigns, who had a feud with The Miz. On the October 9 episode of Raw, Miz opened the show with Cesaro and Sheamus, but they were interrupted by the reunited Shield, who attacked the trio, leading to a six-man tag team Tables, Ladders and Chairs match between The Shield and the team of Cesaro, The Miz and Sheamus at TLC: Tables, Ladders & Chairs. Later,   Braun Strowman and Kane were added to the match as part of The Miz's team. However, Reigns was pulled out of the match on October 20 due to illness and Kurt Angle took his place.

At the event on October 22, Ambrose, Rollins and Angle won the match. While Reigns was still out of action, Ambrose and Rollins also recruited former rival Triple H to be a one-time member at a house show on November 1. Ambrose and Rollins lost the titles back to Cesaro and Sheamus after SmackDown's The New Day appeared and caused a distraction on the November 6 episode of Raw. Reigns returned the following week on Raw, and The Shield challenged The New Day to a match at Survivor Series on November 19. which they won. On the November 20 episode of Raw, Reigns won the Intercontinental Championship by defeating The Miz following a distraction by the other Shield members. In December 2017, Ambrose suffered a triceps injury and was written off TV, thus putting The Shield on a hiatus.

During the group's inactivity, Reigns lost the Intercontinental Championship to The Miz in January 2018. At WrestleMania 34, Rollins defeated The Miz and Finn Bálor in a triple threat match to win the Intercontinental Championship. Rollins and Reigns also continued to acknowledge their on-screen friendship afterwards, working together infrequently, although no longer operating under the Shield banner.

2018–2019 
On the August 13, 2018 episode of Raw, Ambrose returned from his injury and reunited with Rollins during his feud with Dolph Ziggler and Drew McIntyre. Rollins later regained the Intercontinental Championship from Ziggler, while Reigns won the Universal Championship from Brock Lesnar at SummerSlam. On the August 20 episode of Raw, Reigns retained the Universal Championship against Finn Bálor, with Braun Strowman watching from the entrance ramp. After the match, Strowman attempted to cash-in his Money in the Bank contract, however, Rollins and Ambrose made the save, preventing him from cashing in and putting him through the announce table with a triple powerbomb. At Hell in a Cell on September 16, Ziggler and McIntyre retained the Raw Tag Team Championship against Rollins and Ambrose, while Reigns and Strowman's Universal Championship Hell in a Cell match ended in a no contest following interference from Brock Lesnar. The Shield and the team of Strowman, Ziggler and McIntyre had a match at WWE Super Show-Down on October 6, where The Shield was victorious. On October 22, 2018 episode of Raw, Reigns relinquished his Universal title due to real-life leukemia and later that night, Ambrose attacked Rollins after they won the Raw Tag Team Championship. Two weeks later, the AOP defeated Rollins in a handicap match to win the Raw Tag Team Championships, with Ambrose attacking Rollins after the match.

In January 2019, WWE confirmed that Ambrose had declined to renew his contract, which was to expire in April. On the February 25, 2019 episode of Raw, Reigns returned from his leukemia and reunited with Rollins. Later that night, they assisted Ambrose during an attack from Elias, Bobby Lashley, Drew McIntyre and Baron Corbin. The following week, Ambrose saved Reigns and Rollins from McIntyre, Lashley and Corbin, after which the three performed their signature pose. On March 10, The Shield defeated the team of McIntyre, Lashley, and Corbin at Fastlane, which was promoted as the group's final match together. At WrestleMania 35, Rollins won the Universal Championship from Brock Lesnar. Meanwhile on the card, Reigns defeated McIntyre in a grudge match, while Ambrose was absent from the event.

Before the formal end of Ambrose's contract with WWE, The Shield made a final appearance during a WWE Network special event called The Shield's Final Chapter. In the main event, The Shield defeated Corbin, Lashley and McIntyre, in both the group and Ambrose's last match in WWE.

In the aftermath of The Shield's final match, Ambrose's contract expired on April 30, and he departed WWE to wrestle for All Elite  Wrestling and New Japan Pro-Wrestling under his former ring name Jon Moxley. Rollins would continue his reign as Universal Champion and feud with Lesnar until SummerSlam. Reigns would be involved in various rivalries throughout the following months, feuding with the likes of Shane McMahon, Drew McIntyre, Elias and Erick Rowan.

Post-initial split and legacy 

For the remainder of 2014, Ambrose and Rollins feuded with each other due to Rollins' betrayal and alliance with the Authority, whereas Reigns was quickly inserted into world title contention. Ambrose and Rollins' prolonged feud won Pro Wrestling Illustrateds Feud of the Year award for 2014. At the end of the year, Pro Wrestling Torch writer Shawn Valentino labelled The Shield as a "three-headed dragon" and the seventh top WWE story of the year, writing that The Shield "was one of the coolest acts in wrestling in recent years, and most fans believed they were broken up prematurely," adding that "each member of The Shield has made their mark, and they all look like they will be big stars in the future". All three former Shield members main evented a WWE pay-per-view event as a singles competitor within four months of the group's dissolution. In addition, Rollins won the 2014 Money in the Bank ladder match and subsequently cashed in his contract to become the WWE World Heavyweight Champion during the main event of WrestleMania 31, while Reigns won the 2015 Royal Rumble match and competed for the world title in the same main event of Rollins' cash in.

Despite no longer formally operating as a team, Ambrose and Reigns continued to infrequently work together and maintained an on-screen friendship following The Shield's split. On the January 9, 2015 episode of SmackDown, Reigns was about to be put into a handicap match against Rollins and Big Show until Ambrose came to the aid of Reigns and helped defeat them, with the two continuously helping each other against The Authority thereafter. On the May 4 episode of Raw, Ambrose defeated Rollins in a non-title match and (as per a pre-match stipulation by the Director of Operations Kane) gained his first opportunity for the WWE World Heavyweight Championship, being added to the title match at Payback on May 17 and making it a fatal four-way match, also including Reigns and Randy Orton, who was pinned by Rollins. During the match, Ambrose, Reigns and Rollins briefly worked together to perform their signature triple powerbomb on Orton through the announce table. On May 31, Ambrose faced Rollins for the WWE World Heavyweight Championship at Elimination Chamber, where he won by disqualification after Rollins pushed the referee in Ambrose's way as he tried to catch the standing Rollins with his signature diving elbow drop. After the match, Reigns emerged to help Ambrose fend off an attack by The Authority. Despite the win, Ambrose did not gain the championship, but he still took the championship belt with him and challenged Rollins in a ladder match at Money in the Bank on June 14, which he lost.

After Rollins legitimately suffered multiple injuries to his right knee (he tore the ACL, MCL and medial meniscus while attempting to execute a sunset flip powerbomb) at a live event in Dublin, Ireland on November 4, a tournament was set up to crown a new champion. The tournament began on the November 9 episode of Raw, involving 16 wrestlers and with the final match scheduled for Survivor Series to determine the new champion, while Reigns became the number one contender after winning a fatal four-way match on the October 26 episode of Raw, which led Triple H trying to persuade Reigns into joining The Authority (by doing so, Reigns would have automatically been placed in the championship match), but he refused, thus requiring him to compete in the tournament. At Survivor Series on November 22, Ambrose and Reigns won their respective matches to advance to the finals, where Reigns defeated Ambrose in the main event to win the vacant title, only to lose it almost immediately after the match to Sheamus, who cashed in his Money in the Bank contract.

Nearing the end of 2015, Ambrose won the Intercontinental Championship for the first time after defeating Kevin Owens at TLC: Tables, Ladders & Chairs on December 13, while Reigns regained the WWE World Heavyweight Championship after defeating Sheamus on Raw the night after. Reigns lost the WWE World Heavyweight Championship to the returning Triple H after being eliminated at the 2016 Royal Rumble event on January 24 while Ambrose also competed in the Royal Rumble match and was the runner-up, being eliminated last by Triple H. At Fastlane on February 21, Ambrose and Reigns wrestled in a triple threat match also involving Brock Lesnar for the right to face Triple H at WrestleMania 32 for the WWE World Heavyweight Championship, which Ambrose lost after Reigns pinned him. On April 3, Reigns defeated Triple H to win the title for a third time.

After Reigns successfully defended the WWE World Heavyweight Championship against AJ Styles at Extreme Rules on May 22, Rollins returned from injury and attacked Reigns to immediately set his sights on the title he never lost. All three members of The Shield briefly reunited on the June 13 episode of Raw, when Ambrose hosted his Ambrose Asylum segment with Rollins and Reigns as guests in a lead up to their respective matches at Money in the Bank: Ambrose in the Money in the Bank ladder match, Reigns and Rollins in the main event for the championship. At the event on June 19, Ambrose won the Money in the Bank ladder match, and Rollins regained the WWE World Heavyweight Championship from Reigns in the main event, only to lose the title to Ambrose immediately afterwards when he successfully cashed in his Money in the Bank briefcase, making all of the former Shield members WWE Champion on the same night. All three members of The Shield competed in a triple threat match for the renamed WWE Championship at Battleground on July 24, where Ambrose was victorious after pinning Reigns.

The Shield members briefly reunited once again at Survivor Series on November 20 during its traditional 5-on-5 Survivor Series elimination match, with Rollins and Reigns on Team Raw and Ambrose on Team SmackDown, when all three members executed their signature triple powerbomb on Ambrose's rival AJ Styles after Ambrose turned on his team to attack Styles. In December 2016, they appeared together at Tribute to the Troops during a backstage segment with The Club (AJ Styles, Karl Anderson and Luke Gallows) and The New Day (Big E, Kofi Kingston and Xavier Woods).

 Championships and accomplishments 
 Pro Wrestling Illustrated Tag Team of the Year (2013) – Rollins and Reigns
 Ranked Ambrose No. 26 of the top 500 singles wrestlers in the PWI 500 in 2013
 Ranked Rollins No. 35 of the top 500 singles wrestlers in the PWI 500 in 2013
 Ranked Reigns No. 39 of the top 500 singles wrestlers in the PWI 500 in 2013
 Wrestling Observer Newsletter Most Improved (2013) – Reigns
 Tag Team of the Year (2013) – Rollins and Reigns
 Worst Feud of the Year (2013) – 

 WWE'''
NXT Championship (1 time) - Rollins
WWE Intercontinental Championship (2 times) – Reigns (1), Rollins (1)
 WWE Raw Tag Team Championship (3 times) – Rollins and Reigns (1), Rollins and Ambrose (2)
 WWE United States Championship (1 time) – Ambrose
 WWE Universal Championship (2 times) – Reigns (1), Rollins (1)
 Slammy Award (5 times)
 Breakout Star of the Year (2013)
 Faction of the Year (2013, 2014)
 Trending Now (Hashtag) of the Year (2013) – #BelieveInTheShield
 "What a Maneuver" of the Year (2013) – Reigns' spear
WWE Year-End Award for Best Reunion (2018)

 Media The Destruction of The Shield (February 17, 2015, DVD)The Shield: Justice For All'' (July 10, 2018, DVD)

See also 
 Persona and reception of Roman Reigns

Notes

References 

WWE teams and stables
The Authority (professional wrestling) members
WWE NXT teams and stables